This is a list of electoral results for the electoral district of Toorak in Victorian state elections.

Members for Toorak

Election results

Elections in the 1960s

Elections in the 1950s

Elections in the 1940s

 Preferences were not distributed.

Elections in the 1930s

Elections in the 1920s

Elections in the 1910s

 Preferences were not distributed.

References

Victoria (Australia) state electoral results by district